Danilo Mesquita Santos de Oliveira (born 26 February 1992), is a Brazilian actor and singer.

Career 
Before becoming an actor, he dedicated himself for seven years to football. At the age of 18, he tried modeling, but he became an actor at the Espaço Nu in 2012. After graduating in theater, in 2012 he performed in the play Paixão de Cristo. In 2014 in the play The Merchant of Venice. In 2015, he made his debut in soap operas, playing Máximo in I Love Paraisópolis. In 2016, it integrated in the list of the new season of the novel the Os Dez Mandamentos interpreting Tales. Still in 2016, he participated in two episodes of the 3% series of Netflix as Alexandre. In 2017 lived Nicolau, a young cancer victim in the novel Rock Story. Besides being an actor, Danilo is also a singer, since 2018 he and actor Ravel Andrade play and sing in the band Beraderos.

In 2018, Valentim lived in the novel Segundo Sol. In 2019, he signed with Netflix and starred in the series Spectros, which is scheduled to debut in 2020. In 2019, his band Beraderos signed with A Nascimento Música, a label created by Milton Nascimento and his son Augusto, and began recording the group's first album. In 2020, he starred alongside Giovanna Lancellotti, the feature film Rich in Love, playing Teto, a rich young man and future heir to his father's successful tomato factory, who, when he meets Paula, a country girl, hopes to conquer her mind saying to have been raised by a poor family, lies will put you in serious trouble. The film is a romantic comedy starring Netflix.

Filmography

Television

Film

References 

1992 births
Living people